Jean De Meulemeester (19 May 1922 – 1970) was a Belgian sailor. He competed in the Dragon event at the 1952 Summer Olympics.

References

External links
 

1922 births
1970 deaths
Belgian male sailors (sport)
Olympic sailors of Belgium
Sailors at the 1952 Summer Olympics – Dragon
Place of birth missing